Sphaerolobium hygrophilum is a species of flowering plant in the family Fabaceae and is endemic to the south-west of Western Australia. It was first formally described in 2004 by Ryonen Butcher in Australian Systematic Botany from specimens collected near Northcliffe in 2000. The specific epithet (hygrophilum) means "water-loving".

Sphaerolobium hygrophilum grows in winter-wet areas, swamps and near watercourses in the Jarrah Forest, Swan Coastal Plain and Warren bioregions of south-western Western Australia and is listed as "not threatened" by the Government of Western Australia Department of Biodiversity, Conservation and Attractions.

References

hygrophilum
Eudicots of Western Australia
Plants described in 2004